Hammersmith is a London Underground station in Hammersmith. It is the western terminus of the Circle and Hammersmith & City lines. The station is in Travelcard Zone 2.

It is a short walk from the station of the same name on the Piccadilly and District lines. The two stations are separated by Hammersmith Broadway. They are about 60 m apart (200 ft) door to door, although the positions of the pedestrian crossings on the Broadway makes it farther on foot.

The Circle line has served Hammersmith since 13 December 2009. By June 2011 all of the platforms had been lengthened to accommodate the new and longer S7 Stock trains, that first entered service on the Hammersmith and City Line from the beginning of July 2012. These new trains are seven cars in length instead of the six cars of C Stock that previously operated.

History

The present station is situated on Beadon Road and opened on 1 December 1868, replacing the original station slightly north of here which opened on 13 June 1864 when the Metropolitan Railway's extension was built from Paddington.

The Metropolitan Railway operated a service from Hammersmith to Richmond from 1877 over the lines of the London and South Western Railway (lines that are now part of the modern District line) from a junction just north of this station via an adjacent station at Hammersmith (Grove Road) and a viaduct connection to Ravenscourt Park. Part of this viaduct is still visible from District and Piccadilly line trains west of the Hammersmith station on those lines. The extension closed on 31 December 1906 shortly after the introduction of electric trains on the line.

Depot
The Hammersmith depot is located just outside the station. It is used for general maintenance and storage of the S7 Stock trains which operate on the Hammersmith & City line.

On 29 August 1991, three incendiary devices, attributed to the IRA, were discovered under a seat at the depot. There were no injuries.

Connections
London Buses routes 9, 27, 33, 72, 190, 209, 211, 220, 266, 267, 283, 295, 391, 419, 485, H91 and night route N9, N11 and N97 serve the station and the nearby Hammersmith bus station.

In popular culture

The station appears in the film Adulthood (2008), as well as an earlier version of the music video for Lily Allen's "LDN". Lily enters the station and boards a train with her red Raleigh Chopper bicycle, alighting at Ladbroke Grove station. The station also appears in the music video of "Bravo Lover" by Taiwanese pop singer Jolin Tsai.

See also
Hammersmith tube station (District and Piccadilly lines)
Hammersmith Grove Road, a third station that used to exist adjacent to the Hammersmith and City Line station on the L&SWR line through Shepherd's Bush to the West London Line.

References

External links

 
 
 
 

Circle line (London Underground) stations
Hammersmith & City line stations
Tube stations in the London Borough of Hammersmith and Fulham
Former Hammersmith and City Railway stations
Railway stations in Great Britain opened in 1864
Railway stations in Great Britain closed in 1868
Railway stations in Great Britain opened in 1868
London Underground depots
Hammersmith

it:Hammersmith (metropolitana di Londra)#Hammersmith (Circle e Hammersmith & City Line)